Suzette Jones known as Sue Jones is an Welsh-born Australian actress best known for her television roles, in soap operas, sitcoms and telemovies, in particular for playing Pam Willis in Neighbours from 1990 to 1994, with itinerant returns. She is the aunt of Kylie Minogue and Dannii Minogue

Biography

She had also played an ongoing role in the situation comedy The Tea Ladies (1978), and in Prisoner in 1981 as Kathy Hall. Other credits include several roles in police drama Blue Heelers, the short film Pinata (which premiered at the Melbourne International Film Festival in 2009), and Anthony Crowley's Shadow Passion at Chapel Off Chapel in September 2007, playing the role of Margaret. In 2013 and 2014, Jones had a recurring role in the ABC comedy series Upper Middle Bogan as Pat.

Filmography

FILM

TELEVISION

References

External links
 

Australian television actresses
Australian people of Welsh descent
Living people
Year of birth missing (living people)